Jim Whitesell (born December 27, 1959) is an American college basketball coach who most recently served as the head men's coach for the Buffalo Bulls. He has previously coached at the Division I level as a head coach at Loyola University Chicago and an assistant at St. John's and Saint Louis. Whitesell replaced Larry Farmer as head coach of the Ramblers on April 14, 2004. Whitesell was fired as head coach of the Ramblers on March 14, 2011, after seven seasons, posting a 109–106 record in that time. Whitesell was hired in August 2013 as an assistant coach at St. John's to fill the void left by former director of basketball operations Moe Hicks. On April 16, 2015, he was named associate head coach of men's basketball at the University at Buffalo. On April 6, 2019, Whitesell was named the 14th head coach of men's basketball at the University at Buffalo, filling the void left by Nate Oats when he resigned to take the head coach position at the University of Alabama.  On March 11, 2023, after four seasons and a 70–49 record he was fired as the Buffalo head coach.

Several of Whitesell's brothers work in the entertainment industry, including director John Whitesell, writer Chris Whitesell, writer/actor Sean Whitesell, and agent Patrick Whitesell.

Head coaching record

References

1959 births
Living people
American men's basketball coaches
American men's basketball players
Basketball coaches from Iowa
Basketball players from Iowa
Buffalo Bulls men's basketball coaches
College men's basketball head coaches in the United States
College men's basketball players in the United States
Elmhurst Bluejays men's basketball coaches
Lewis Flyers men's basketball coaches
Loyola Ramblers men's basketball coaches
Luther College (Iowa) alumni
Minnesota State Mavericks men's basketball coaches
North Dakota Fighting Hawks men's basketball coaches
People from Iowa Falls, Iowa
Saint Louis Billikens men's basketball coaches
St. John's Red Storm men's basketball coaches
Wabash Valley Warriors men's basketball coaches
Whitesell family